Mariz is a Portuguese and Brazilian surname. 
Notable people with the surname include:

 Angélica de Mariz Sarmento (c.1670–1715), Portuguese noblewoman, court lady to Queen of Portugal D. Maria Sophia of Neuburg (1666-1699) and governess of Infante Manuel, Count of Ourém (1697-1766)
  (1937–1995), Brazilian lawyer and politician, 44th governor of the State of Paraíba
  (1536–1584), Portuguese nobleman and one of the founders of Rio de Janeiro in 1565
 António de Mariz Carneiro (fl. 1623–1642), Portuguese nobleman, official cosmographer to the Portuguese crown
  (1643–1657), grandson of Dom Antônio de Mariz, 1st bishop of Rio de Janeiro
 Antônio Carlos de Mariz e Barros (1835–1866), son of admiral Joaquim José Inácio, Viscount of Inhaúma, Brazilian military officer and hero of the War of the Triple Alliance. Several warships of the Brazilian navy bear his name
  (1745–1822), Portuguese nobleman and officer, 1st Baron of Andaluz and 1st Viscount of Andaluz
 Augusto Duarte Rozeira de Mariz (1946), Portuguese politician and author, founding member of the Partido Socialista (Portugal)
 Cecília de Mariz, fictitious character in the novel The Guarani (1857) by Brazilian author José de Alencar, a foundational text of Brazilian Romanticism, adapted for opera (Il Guarany by Antônio Carlos Gomes), film and comics
  (1903–1984), Brazilian politician, 39th governor of the State of Rio Grande do Norte
 Ivan Mariz (1910–1982), Brazilian footballer
  (1847–1916), Portuguese doctor and botanist
 José Alves de Mariz (1844-1912), 36th bishop of Bragança e Miranda (1885-1912)
  (1550–1615), Portuguese librarian, historian and author of the first biography of Portuguese kings with their portraits (Diálogos de varia história) and first biography of Luís de Camões (1613)
 Pedro Homem de Mariz (1674-), diplomat, active in the negotiations leading to the Exchange of the Princesses (1729)
 Pedro de Mariz de Sousa Sarmento (c1745-1822), Vice Admiral of the Portuguese Navy
 Wanderley Mariz (1940–2020), Brazilian politician and lawyer, son of Dinarte Mariz